The Monitor is the second studio album by American indie rock band Titus Andronicus, released in March 2010 through XL Recordings. It is a concept album loosely based on themes relating to the American Civil War.

The album title is a reference to the USS Monitor, the first ironclad warship commissioned by the United States Navy, and the closing track, "The Battle of Hampton Roads", refers to the battle between the Monitor and the CSS Virginia, which took place on March 8–9, 1862; according to the band, "Releasing this record is our way of celebrating the 148th anniversary of this historic event." There are numerous references to early Billy Bragg songs such as some lyrics in "A More Perfect Union" and the song "Richard II". "A More Perfect Union" also includes references to the band's New Jersey roots as well as riffs on the lyrics of Bruce Springsteen, another New Jersey native. The Monitor features guest appearances by members of Ponytail, Wye Oak, Hallelujah The Hills, Felice Brothers, Spider Bags, Vivian Girls and the Hold Steady.

Reception

The Monitor received a Metacritic score of 82 out of 100, signaling universal acclaim. Pitchfork included the album in their list of top albums of 2010, at #10 while Spectrum Culture gave the album its #1 position. "The Monitor" was named Exclaim!'s No. 20 Pop & Rock Album of 2010.

The album was recognized as number 30 of The 100 Best Albums of the Decade So Far by Pitchfork Media in August 2014.

Track listing
All tracks written by Patrick Stickles.

"A More Perfect Union" – 7:09
"Titus Andronicus Forever" – 1:55
"No Future Part Three: Escape From No Future" – 5:16
"Richard II or Extraordinary Popular Dimensions and the Madness of Crowds (Responsible Hate Anthem)" – 5:06
"A Pot in Which to Piss" – 8:53
"Four Score and Seven" – 8:38
"Theme from Cheers" – 5:01
"To Old Friends and New" – 7:00
"...And Ever" – 2:24
"The Battle of Hampton Roads" – 14:02

Personnel

Titus Andronicus
 Patrick Stickles – Guitar, harmonica, piano, synthesizer, tape operator, electronics, engineer, vocals
 Liam Betson – Guitar, vocals
 Ian Graetzer – Bass
 Eric Harm – Drums, percussion, vocals

Additional musicians
 Julian Veronesi – Vocals
 Dan McGee – Vocals
 Matt Miller – Vocals
 Brendan Stickles – Vocals
 Ryan Walsh – Vocals
 Andrew Cedermark – Guitar
 Pete Feigenbaum – Guitar
 Kevin McMahon – Guitar, mixing, percussion, producer, recording, vocals
 Ian O'Neil – Guitar, vocals
 Jenn Wasner – Guitar, vocals
 Dustin Wong – Guitar
 David Bentley – Cello
 Brett Bondar – Highland bagpipes, Scottish small pipes
 Peter Buettner – Tenor saxophone
 Elio DeLuca – Piano, organ, electric piano, engineer, vocals
 Ian Dykstra – Bass drums, sleigh bells, tambourine
 Greg Farley – Fiddle
 Dean Jones – Trombone
 Brian Rutledge – Trumpet
 Alex Tretiak – Snare drums, research assistant, vocals
 Andy Stack – Engineer
 Dustin Miller – Vocal recording

References

2010 albums
Concept albums
Titus Andronicus (band) albums
XL Recordings albums